Administration and Society is a peer-reviewed academic journal that covers the field of public administration. The journal's editor-in-chief is Brian J. Cook (Virginia Tech). It was established in 1969 and is currently published by SAGE Publications.

Abstracting and indexing 
Administration and Society is abstracted and indexed in Scopus and the Social Sciences Citation Index. According to the Journal Citation Reports, its 2017 impact factor (IF) is 1.761, ranking it 27 out of 47 journals in the category "Public Administration".

References

External links 
 

SAGE Publishing academic journals
English-language journals
Business and management journals
Publications established in 1969
8 times per year journals